Bill Tieleman is a lobbyist and former NDP political strategist in Vancouver, British Columbia, Canada. He is known for opposing the 2009 referendum on electoral reform, and  the 2018 referendum on whether to hold a second vote to choose a proportional voting system.  Tieleman is also known for strongly advocating hydraulic fracturing to extract methane for export from BC, and for denying the role of global warming in BC forest fires.   Tieleman supported the Site C dam  & opposed the 2017 governing agreement between three elected BC Greens & NDP leader John Horgan.

Career 
Tieleman was a director of communications (public relations) for the British Columbia Federation of Labour and also in the Office of the New Democratic Premier Glen Clark. Tieleman owns West Star Communications, a consulting firm that provides "strategy and communication services for labour, business, non-profits and government," according to Tieleman's blog. Tieleman appears as a political commentator on radio and writes a politics column weekly in the 24 Hours newspaper and The Tyee online magazine. From 2005 to 2009, he appeared as a guest opposite Norman Spector weekly on CKNW's Bill Good Show.  Tieleman also participated in a political panel for about 10 years on CBC Vancouver Early Edition radio show.

He previously wrote a Political Connections column for The Georgia Straight.

He is known for his commentary and coverage of the BC Legislature Raids. In December 2007, he came back from the courtroom to discover that his office had been broken-into and materials related to the trial moved about. Tieleman regarded this as an attempt at intimidation. In 2008, Tieleman reported receiving death threats following a 24 Hours column calling for a boycott of China.

In April 2021, Tieleman took a strong position against rezoning some of Vancouver to allow more social housing.

In June 2022, Tieleman was nominated by the civic party TEAM for a Livable Vancouver to run for city council under the TEAM banner in the 2022 Vancouver municipal election.

Referendum
He was president of the No STV Campaign Society that successfully prevented the introduction of BC-STV, a form of Single-Transferable Voting in the second referendum on provincial electoral reform. Tieleman played "the leading role on behalf of the No STV camp in the public debates and discussions." The NO STV campaign concentrated their media buy in the final two weeks prior to the referendum. Opposition to the measure increased from the first referendum, he felt, because citizens had more information on the practical consequences of STV, including large multi-member ridings.

After the Liberal government of Premier Gordon Campbell introduced the concept of a new Harmonized Sales Tax or HST, Tieleman started a No HST campaign on Facebook. When Facebook removed the group in January 2010, Tieleman claimed it was the province's largest Facebook group with more than 130,000 members. The group was restored by Facebook without explanation two days later. He also became a strategist and media spokesman for Fight HST, the official proponent, led by Bill Vander Zalm, seeking a referendum to cancel the HST in accordance with the Recall and Initiative Act.

Tieleman sought official recognition (with allies Suzanne Anton & Bob Plecas)  to oppose a 2018 referendum on whether to hold a second vote to choose a proportional voting system. As both sides of the referendum receive public funding, this is effectively an application for direct subsidy for lobbying efforts.

Personal 
Tieleman holds a master's degree in political science from the University of British Columbia and lives in Vancouver. As a student at UBC, Tieleman quit the negotiating team for the teaching assistant union in a dispute over the settling of a labour dispute with the university. 
Tieleman has served as a director of the board for VanCity, the Vancouver City Savings Credit Union.

References

External links
 Bill Tieleman official blog
 Bill Tieleman's articles on The Tyee
 Wine Barbarian blog

Canadian political consultants
Canadian political commentators
Living people
People from Vancouver
University of British Columbia alumni
Year of birth missing (living people)